The Condor Legion was a unit of military personnel from the air force and army of Nazi Germany, which served with the Nationalist faction during the Spanish Civil War. The Condor Legion developed methods of strategic bombing that were used widely during the Second World War. The bombing of Guernica was the most infamous operation carried out by the Condor Legion. Hugo Sperrle commanded the unit's aircraft formations and Wilhelm Ritter von Thoma commanded the ground element.

History of military aid to Spain 

After the military coup in Spain on 17 July 1936 launched the Spanish Civil War, the Nationalists requested the support of Nazi Germany and Fascist Italy. The first request for German aircraft was made on 22 July, with an order for 10 transport aircraft. German Führer Adolf Hitler decided to support the Nationalists on 25 or 26 July, but was wary of provoking a wider European war. The Reich Air Travel Ministry concluded that Nationalist forces would need at least 20 Junkers Ju 52s, flown by Luft Hansa pilots, to carry the Spanish Army of Africa from Spanish Morocco to Spain. This mission became known as Operation Magic Fire. To carry out this mission, a joint venture was created between the Spanish-German "Spanish-Moroccan Transport Company" (HISMA) and the German Raw Materials and Good Purchasing Company. The German involvement was kept hidden from the foreign and the economic ministries and funded with three million Reichsmarks.

The organisation and the recruitment of German volunteers was also kept secret.
The first contingent of 86 men left Germany on 1 August 1936. Unaware of their destination, they were accompanied by six biplane fighters, anti-aircraft guns and about 100 tons of other supplies. Many believed that the German troops’ role would be to train the Nationalists and not to engage in active combat. 

The volunteers were stationed at Tablada Airfield near Seville, and, with the support of German Air transport, began the airlift of Francisco Franco's troops to Spain. Germany's involvement grew in September to encompass the Wehrmacht's other branches. Operation Magic Fire was renamed Operation Guido in November. The Kriegsmarine provided submarines in 24 October and also provided various surface ships and co-ordinated movement of German supplies to Spain. German U-boats were dispatched to Spanish waters under the codename Ursula.

In the two weeks after 27 July, German transport moved nearly 2,500 troops of the Army of Africa to Spain. By 11 October, the mission's official end, 13,500 troops, 127 machine guns and 36 field guns had been transported to mainland Spain from Morocco. Over that period, there was a movement from training- and supply-missions to overt combat. The operation commander, Alexander von Scheele, was replaced by Walter Warlimont. In September, 86 tons of bombs, 40 Panzer I tanks and 122 personnel had been deployed in Spain. They were accompanied by 108 aircraft from July to October, divided between aircraft for the Nationalist faction itself and planes for German volunteers in Spain.

German air-crews supported the August-to-October 1936 Nationalist advance on Madrid, and the successful relief of the Siege of the Alcázar on 27 September 1936. Ultimately, the initial phase of the Siege of Madrid proved unsuccessful. Soviet air support for the Republicans was growing, particularly through the supply of Polikarpov aircraft. Warlimont appealed to Germany to step up support. After Berlin's recognition of Franco's government on 30 September, German efforts in Spain were reorganised and expanded. The existing command structure was replaced with the Winterübung Rügen,
and the military units already in Spain were formed into a new legion, which was briefly called the "Iron Rations" and the "Iron Legion" before Hermann Göring renamed it the "Condor Legion". The first German chargé d'affaires to Franco's government, General Wilhelm Faupel, arrived in November, but was told not to interfere in military matters.

Motivation
In the years after the Spanish Civil War, Hitler gave several possible motives for German involvement. These included: providing distraction from German rearmament; preventing the spread of communism to Western Europe; creating a state friendly to Germany in order to disrupt Britain and France; and opening up possibilities for economic expansion. Although the Nationalist offensive on Madrid was abandoned in March 1937, a series of attacks on weaker Republican-controlled areas was supported by the Condor Legion. Despite prolonging the Civil War, it would help to distract the other western powers from Hitler's ambitions in Central Europe. Furthermore, the offensive on Vizcaya, a mining and industrial centre, would help fuel German industry. In a speech at Würzburg on 27 June 1937, Hitler declared that he supported Franco in order to gain control of Spanish ore.

Discussions over German objectives for intervention occurred in January 1937. Germany was keen to avoid prompting a wider European war, which was a risk if it committed further resources to Spain. There was no consensus among German officials: Ernst von Weizsäcker of the German Foreign Office suggested that it was merely a matter of graceful withdrawal, and Göring stated that Germany would never recognise a "red Spain". A joint Italian–German agreement stated that the last shipments would be made no later than early February.

It has been speculated that Hitler used the Spanish Civil War issue to distract Benito Mussolini from Hitler's own plans to annex Austria. The authoritarian, Catholic and anti-Nazi Vaterländische Front ran the government of Austria from 1933 to 1938 and had been allied with Mussolini. In 1934, the assassination of Austrian Chancellor Engelbert Dollfuss had already given rise to Italian military assistance to prevent a German invasion.

A communiqué in December 1936 from Ulrich von Hassell, the German ambassador in Rome, made another point — that Italy’s involvement in the Spanish Civil War kept it firmly out of the camp of Western powers :
The role played by the Spanish conflict as regards Italy's relations with France and England could be similar to that of the Abyssinian conflict, bringing out clearly the actual, opposing interests of the powers and thus preventing Italy from being drawn into the net of the Western powers and used for their machinations.... All the more clearly will Italy recognize the advisability of confronting the Western powers shoulder to shoulder with Germany.

Military operations
The anti-aircraft guns used by Flakabteilung 88 were the standard German anti-aircraft guns of the time: the 8.8cm Flak 18, 3.7cm Flak 18 and 2cm Flak 30. Overall command was given to Hugo Sperrle, with Alexander Holle as chief of staff. Scheele was transferred to become a military attaché in Salamanca. Also operational were two armoured units under the command of Wilhelm Ritter von Thoma, with four Panzer I tanks each.

The Nationalists were supported by German and Italian units and material at the Battle of Madrid. However, the military situation in Madrid remained poor for the Nationalists. Under orders from Franco, both German and Italian aircraft began bombing raids on the city as a whole. The Germans were keen to observe the effects on a city of bombings and deliberate burning of civilian sites. Offensives involving German aircraft, as well as the bombings, were unsuccessful. Growing Republican air superiority became increasingly apparent, particularly the strength of the Soviet Polikarpov I-15 and I-16 aircraft, but the historian Hugh Thomas described their armaments as "primitive". 

In November and December, Faupel advocated the creation of a single German unit of 15,000 to 30,000 men, which he believed would be enough to turn the tide of the war toward the Nationalists. Hans-Heinrich Dieckhoff argued that this would be insufficient and that larger measures could provoke the wrath of the Spanish. Between late 1936 and early 1937, new aircraft were sent to the Condor Legion, including Henschel Hs 123 dive bombers, and prototypes of the Heinkel He 112 and Messerschmitt Bf 109, with the latter proving the most successful. The Heinkel He 111 was added to the bomber fleet, along with the Dornier Do 17 (E and F types). Older aircraft were passed onto the Nationalists. By the end of 1936, approximately 7,000 Condor Legion personnel were in Spain.

German forces also operated in the Battle of Jarama, which began with a Nationalist offensive on 6 February 1937. It included German-supplied ground forces, including two batteries of machine guns, a tank division, and the Condor Legion's anti-aircraft guns. Bombing by both Republican and Nationalist aircraft, including Ju 52s from the Legion, created a stalemate. It showed up the inadequacy of the Legion's aircraft when faced with superior Soviet-made fighters. Von Thoma requested Irish nationalist support for a tank advance at one point, never to be replicated. The use of He 51 and Ju 52s and the Legion's anti-aircraft guns used in ground roles only partly mitigated the significant defeat for the Nationalists at the Battle of Guadalajara in March. A joint Italian-German general staff had been set up in January 1937 to advise Franco on war planning. The defeat of a significant Italian force and the growing Soviet superiority in tanks and aircraft led the Germans to support a plan to abandon the offensive on Madrid and instead to concentrate a series of attacks on weaker Republican-controlled areas. 

Some concluded from these experiences that motorised troops had proved less effective than had first been thought. Furthermore, the inadequacy of the Italians as a fighting force had became apparent to the Germans.

Vizcaya campaign
The isolated area of Vizcaya, a predominantly-Basque region of northern Spain, was the most immediate target in what was called the War in the North. It was largely a Nationalist and Italian offensive, but it was supported by a consistently re-equipping Condor Legion. The terrain was favourable, with the planes coming over a range of mountains to the south, which masked their entrance. Sperrle remained in Salamanca, and Wolfram von Richthofen replaced Holle in January as deputy and was in actual command. Since the Basque air force was very limited, fighter aircraft were even used in ground-attack roles (as opposed to, for example, air-to-air combat). The Legion's air force initially attacked the towns of Ochandiano and Durango. Durango had no anti-aircraft defence and only a few other defences. According to the Basques, 250 civilians died there on the 31 March, including the priest, nuns and the congregation of a church ceremony. The Germans, with their air raids, were hated. The Basque ground forces were in full retreat towards Bilbao through the town of Guernica, which was bombed on 26 April in one of the most controversial attacks of the Spanish Civil War.

Guernica

In Operation Rügen, waves of Ju 52 and He 111 planes bombed and strafed targets in Guernica. The number of casualties is a matter of controversy, with perhaps 200 or 300 people killed; the casualties reported by the Basques were 1,654 dead and 889 wounded. Several explanations were put forward by the Nationalists, including blaming the attack on the Republicans; or claiming the attack was part of a prolonged offensive; or that the Rentería bridge, outside Guernica, was the true target. However, the nature of the operation itself, including the formation and armaments that were used, undermines the credibility of these explanations. Guernica was a clear target of the Condor Legion, rather than the Nationalists as a whole. The offensive on Bilbao, when it eventually came on 11 July, was supported by ground units of the Condor Legion and extensive air operations. It proved the worth of the Condor Legion to the Nationalist cause.

The first English-language media reports of the destruction in Guernica appeared two days after the attack. George Steer, a reporter for The Times, who was covering the Spanish Civil War from inside the country, wrote the first full account of events. Steer's reporting set the tone for much of the subsequent reportage. Steer pointed out the clear German complicity in the action. The evidence of three small bomb cases stamped with the German Imperial Eagle made it clear that the official German position of neutrality in the war and the signing of a Non-Intervention Pact were only nominal and that German forces were actively participating in combat. Steer's report was syndicated to the New York Times and then worldwide and generated widespread shock, outrage and fear.

Further campaigns
The Condor Legion also took part in the Battle of Brunete, which was a Republican offensive designed to take the pressure off northern Spain, where the fighting was ongoing. The Legion was sent from the north to reinforce the broken line. There were repeated raids by bombers and by fighters based at Salamanca on Republican armoured vehicles and, later, defensive positions. Despite Nationalist fears, the Republican aircraft were ineffective, compared with German aircraft. The Messerschmitt Bf 109 was shown to be superior to the I-15 and I-16 models used by Republican forces. The Legion lost 8 aircraft but claimed 18 victories. German tactics were also improved with the experience of Brunete, particularly with the en masse use of tanks by the Nationalists.

The Nationalists returned to focus on the capture of northern Spain. The latest models of German test aircraft faced an outdated Basque air force (that had some Russian planes). Heavy aerial bombardment from 200 Nationalist, German and Italian planes occurred far behind Basque lines in August 1937 and led to the fall of Santander after the Battle of Santander on 1 September. The formal battle in Asturias ended with the fall of Gijon on 21 October. A large amount of ammunitions was used by the Legion, including a million machine gun rounds and 2,500 tonnes of bombs. Germany immediately began to ship industrial production back to the country. Sperrle argued repeatedly with Faupel and against HISMA's monopoly. Faupel was replaced by Franco through Sperrle. After disagreements with Volkmann, Von Richthofen would be replaced with Hermann Plocher in early 1938.

After the next major campaigns, Madrid and Barcelona (discussed above), the Condor Legion was moved to Soria and began a week of strikes against Republican airfields. This move was halted by the Republican advance on Teruel and the ensuing Battle of Teruel. The Legion's land and air forces were deployed, and the Legion moved to Bronchales. Poor weather resulted in few flights, and the town fell to Republican forces on 6 January. Up to 100 sorties a day were launched during the Nationalist's counter-offensive through the Alfambra Valley. The Junkers Ju 87A was used for the first time on the advance on Teruel, which was retaken on 22 February. The continued Nationalist offensive on Aragon in April to June 1937, including the Battle of Belchite, involved bombing raids and the use of the Legion's ground forces. The Legion was switched to focus in the north, towards the Segre River, before it moved south again following Nationalist successes. The Legion moved its main headquarters to Benicarló; single-engined planes operated from airfields nearby and twin-engined planes from Zaragoza. Hitler's words to his colleagues belied a change in attitude about the war in Germany: a quick victory in the war was not desirable, and a mere continuation of the war would be preferable. German policy would be to prevent a Republican defeat. However, casualties were beginning to mount for the Legion, and combined with a resurgence in Republican air activity, the Nationalist advance stalled, perhaps because of the reluctance of commanders in Germany to supply reinforcements, given the emerging Czechoslovak crisis. Debates concerning the rising cost of the operation to the Germans — then at about 10 million Reichsmarks a month  — continued unresolved. The Legion's materiel had been exhausted.

On 24–25 July, Republican forces launched the last major offensive of the war, the Battle of the Ebro. Reconnaissance units of the Condor Legion had noticed a troop build-up and warned Nationalists forces, but the warning went unheeded. Although the Republicans gained ground, they failed to gain control of Gandesa;  422 sorties by the Legion (with around 70 aircraft operational) having considerable effect. The rest of the battle saw a series of attacks using artillery or air strikes, followed by a Nationalist ground advance. However, tensions in Czechoslovakia and a shortage of pilots in Germany led to the return of 250 pilots from the Legion, around half of whom were bomber crews. Although trained Spaniards made up some of the shortfall, Volkmann complained to central command in Berlin, which would lead to his recall in September. During the battle, which saw 113 days of fighting, only 10 aircraft were lost (some by accident) and 14 were badly damaged. The Legion claimed around 100 Republican aircraft, a third of those lost. Only 5 aircrew had been killed and 6 captured. Aid from Germany temporarily halted in mid-September. Germany and Nationalist Spain settled the issue of German interests in Spanish mines.

The Legion took a short break from active duty to receive new aircraft, including Bf 109Es, He 111Es and Js, and Hs 126As, which brought its strength to 96 aircraft —  around a fifth of the Nationalist's force as a whole. Richthofen returned to Spain in overall command, with Hans Seidemann as chief of staff. That reinforcement may have been the single most important intervention by a foreign side in the war by enabling a counterattack after the Battle of the Ebro. It mainly took part in operations against the remaining Republican air force during January–February 1939, with considerable success. After it took part in parades in Barcelona and elsewhere and minor duties over Madrid, it was rapidly dissolved. The men returned on 26 May, the best aircraft were returned to Germany and the rest of the equipment was bought by the newly installed Spanish regime.

The Condor Legion claimed to have destroyed 320 Republican planes using aircraft (either shot down or bombed on the ground) and to have shot down another 52 using anti-aircraft guns. It also claimed to have destroyed 60 ships, including Spanish Republican Navy vessels. It lost 72 aircraft from hostile action and another 160 from accidents.

Maritime operations
The Maritime Reconnaissance Staffel 88 was the Condor Legion's maritime unit under the command of Karl Heinz Wolff. Operating independently of the land-based division, it acted against enemy shipping, ports, coastal communications and occasionally inland targets such as bridges. It used floatplanes, starting with the Heinkel He 60, which began operating at Cadiz in October 1936. Missions started as reconnaissance, but after the move from Cadiz to Melilla in Spanish Morocco in December 1936, the focus shifted to attacks on shipping. It was again moved in February 1937 to Málaga, which was newly captured, and then to Majorca when Málaga proved unsuitable. In June, operations began to be expanded to allow attacks on all Republican ports as long as British ships were not present. There were 10 ships attacked in the second half of 1937, but the Norwegian torpedoes that were used proved ineffective, and strafing or bombing targets was used instead.

The arrival of Martin Harlinghausen (known as "Iron Gustav") saw operations expand, and operations targeted Alicante, Almería, Barcelona and Cartagena. As naval activity declined, inland targets became more numerous, and night missions began. Activities in support of ground forces became the main focus of the unit until the end of hostilities. Both Wolff and Harlinghausen received the Spanish Cross in Gold with Swords and Diamonds. In total, eleven men were killed in action, and five others died due to accident or illness.

Other operations

Overtly, the Kriegsmarine was partly used to enforce the Non-Intervention Agreement from interfering in the war. However, the agreement was clearly broken by Germany. As a result, the German pocket battleship  stood guard over Ceuta to prevent interference from Republican ships while Franco transported troops to the Spanish mainland. By mid-October, the German North Sea Group around Spain consisted of the pocket battleships Deutschland and Admiral Scheer, the light cruiser , and four torpedo boats. After the Germans claimed that Leipzig had been attacked by an unidentified submarine, it was formally withdrawn from international patrols.

Operation Ursula, named after the daughter of Karl Dönitz, involved a group of German U-boats active around Spain. It began on 20 November 1936, with the movement of the U-33 and the U-34 from Wilhelmshaven. Identification marks were obscured, and the whole mission was kept secret. Difficulties in identifying legitimate targets and concerns about discovery limited their operations. During their return to Wilhelmshaven in December, the Republican submarine C-3 was sunk; the Germans claimed that the sinking resulted a torpedo fired by U-34, although the Republican enquiry claimed its loss to have been caused by an internal explosion. Their submarines' return marked the official end of Operation Ursula. However, further submarines seem to have been sent in mid-1937, but details of the operation are not known (although six are believed to have been involved).

Abwehr
The German Intelligence service, the Abwehr, working independently of the Condor Legion, was secretly involved in Operation Bodden. It later played a part in the detection of the Operation Torch invasion fleet.

Return to Germany
On 20 May, the KdF fleet, including the MV Wilhelm Gustloff and 7 other ships, were given secret orders and diverted from their regular pleasure cruise schedule to arrive in Vigo, Spain. They arrived on the 24th to pick up the triumphant legion and departed on the 26th to bring them on a five-day voyage to Hamburg, Germany. There, they arrived to ecstatic crowds, parades and ceremonies celebrating their success, with Hermann Göring and other high-ranking officials in attendance.

Military advantages gained

Training

Many army leaders were hesitant to become involved in the conflict and resisted a call made by the Italian government for a dual transfer of ground troops to Spain. The involvement of the Luftwaffe, however, was not entirely restricted, and a commonly-held viewpoint is that the involvement of the Luftwaffe in the Civil War was a proving ground for troops fighting during World War II. That view is supported by the testimony of Hermann Göring, when he was on trial at Nuremberg. When asked about the decision to use the Luftwaffe, Göring stated:
When the Civil War broke out in Spain, Franco sent a call for help to Germany and asked for support, particularly in the air. One should not forget that Franco with his troops was stationed in Africa and that he could not get the troops across, as the fleet was in the hands of the Communists, or, as they called themselves at the time, the competent Revolutionary Government in Spain. The decisive factor was, first of all, to get his troops over to Spain. The Führer thought the matter over. I urged him to give support [to Franco] under all circumstances, firstly, in order to prevent the further spread of communism in that theater and, secondly, to test my young Luftwaffe at this opportunity in this or that technical respect.That is requently misquoted along these lines: "The Spanish Civil War gave me an opportunity to put my young air force to the test, and a means for my men to gain experience" or other permutations.

That was also a view put forth in western media after the disengagement of German forces from Spain.

Dozens of Messerschmitt Bf 109 fighters and Heinkel He 111 medium bombers and, from December 1937, at least three Junkers Ju 87 Stuka dive-bombers, first saw active service in the Condor Legion against Soviet-supplied aircraft. The Stuka's first mission flown in Spain was February 1938. Each of the aircraft played a major role during the early years of World War II. The Germans also realised that biplane fighters were quickly becoming less effective than newer monoplane designs. The Heinkel He 51 fighter, after suffering many losses during the first twelve months of the conflict, was switched to a ground attack role and later saw service as a trainer.

Other units
The Condor Legion also included non-aircraft units. Panzer crews operating Panzer I light tanks were commanded by Wilhelm Ritter von Thoma. The Germans also tested small numbers of 88 mm Flak 18 anti-aircraft artillery guns to destroy Republican tanks and fortifications with direct fire, as well as enemy aircraft in their designed role.

The German involvement in Spain also saw the development of the first air ambulance service for evacuation of wounded combatants.

Technical advances

One military innovation that is thought to have directly resulted from the conflict is the technical development of the Messerschmitt Bf 109. The V3 – V6 types entered service in Spain directly from operational trials around January 1937. In the spring of 1938, they were joined by type C aircraft with type Es being first deployed in December 1938.

Tactics
Besides the potential gains in combat experience, it is also thought that various strategic initiatives were first tested during Luftwaffe involvement in the conflict. As the fighting progressed into March 1938, Italian pilots under Fieldmarshal Hugo Sperrle launched 13 raids against Barcelona that involved fire and gas bombs and that killed thousands of civilians. It is worth noting that a subsequent commander of the Legion in Spain, Wolfram von Richthofen, would rise to the rank of Field Marshal during World War II and serve in high positions of Luftwaffe throughout the conflict, mostly as a specialist in ground attack. His units spearheaded offensives in Poland, France and the Low Countries, and the Balkans, ans well as Operation Barbarossa.

Tactics of combined or joint operations were a particular focus. Close air support for Nationalist troops, attack bombing of Republican troop concentrations and strafing became features of the war. The Legion worked closely in missions to maximise the fighting ability of the Nationalist air force and troops, the Italian CTV, and pilots from the Aviazione Legionaria (Legionary Air Force). The German air ace Adolf Galland claimed that the focus after World War II on lessons learned by the Germans from the conflict in Spain, the value of these lessons was exaggerated; he believed that the wrong conclusions were drawn by the German High Command, in particular with respect to the Luftwaffe:
Whatever may have been the importance of the tests of German arms in the Spanish Civil War from tactical, technical and operational points of view, they did not provide the experience that was needed nor lead to the formulation of sound strategic concepts.

Commemoration and re-evaluation

Shame in Germany for the activities of the Condor Legion and for its involvement in the bombing of Guernica have re-surfaced since German reunification in the 1990s. In 1997, the 60th anniversary of Operation Rügen, German President Roman Herzog wrote to survivors of the raid to apologise on behalf of the German people and state. Herzog said that he wished to extend "a hand of friendship and reconciliation" on behalf of all German citizens. That sentiment was later ratified by members of the German Parliament who, in 1998, went on to legislate for the removal of all former Legion members' names from associated German military bases. The process was then carried out, but the issue surfaced again in 2005 after media revelations about the role of the pilot Werner Mölders, who had volunteered to serve in Spain. Although he was not involved in the bombing of Guernica, it was decided by German Defence Minister Peter Struck that, in keeping with the law, Mölders' name should be removed from the barracks at Visselhoevede and from the association with Luftwaffe Fighter Wing 74 (Jagdgeschwader 74) based in Neuburg an der Donau. Until 2005, it had not been established that Mölders had flown as a Condor Legion volunteer before his death in 1941.

On 26 April 2017, on the 80th anniversary of the Guernica bombing, the Madrid City Council announced that it had dismantled the memorial tomb for the Condor Legion at the La Almudena cemetery, pictured right. The tomb was removed at the request of the German embassy in Madrid and was to be replaced with simple name plaques for the dead.

Awards
The Spanienkreuz (Spanish Cross) campaign medal was awarded by the German authorities in seven classes from April 14, 1939. The clandestine nature of German activities in Spain caused no awards to be instituted until April 1939, at the end of German involvement in the conflict. The Spanish Cross complemented the Condor Legion Tank Badge, which was approved on 10 July 1939, and cuff titles issued to those who served. Legionnaires could also expect a Campaign Medal struck by the Spanish authorities to thank German volunteers for their service. See both websites listed below for examples of each medal and others issued to Legion veterans.

Other notable events on the return of the Legion included an assembly for a personal address by Hitler on 6 June 1939 and a parade as part of the celebrations organised for Hitler's 50th birthday 20 April 1939. Also by way of commemoration the activities of the Legion were memorialized in a special edition of Der Adler, the Luftwaffe's magazine for service members, which was then also circulated in both Spain and the United States.

Ranks and insignia

Notable participants
 Oskar Dirlewanger
 Rudolf Demme, head trainer
 Adolf Galland
 Hajo Herrmann
 Werner Mölders
 Hugo Sperrle, commander
 Hannes Trautloft
 Heinrich Trettner
 Wolfram Freiherr von Richthofen, commander
 Wilhelm Ritter von Thoma, commander

See also
 Kampfgeschwader 53, nicknamed "Legion Condor"
 Aviazione Legionaria
 Fuerza Aérea Nacional (Arma de Aviación), the Spanish Nationalist Air forces.
 Aviación del Tercio, the Spanish Foreign Legion.
 Fuerza Aérea de la República Española (FARE), the Spanish Second Republic Air Force, supported mainly by the Soviet Union.
 Hugo Jaeger, photographer

Notes

References

Citations

Sources

Further reading

External links 

 "Aerial Warfare and the Spanish Civil War" by Pamela Feltus at centennialofflight.net
 "Spanish Civil War: German Condor Legion's Tactical Air Power" by Walter A. Musciano at TheHistoryNet.com

Expatriate military units and formations
Francoist Spain
Military units and formations of Nazi Germany in the Spanish Civil War
German military personnel of the Spanish Civil War
Military units and formations established in 1936
Military units and formations disestablished in 1939
Military units and formations of the Luftwaffe
Foreign volunteers in the Spanish Civil War
Germany–Spain military relations
Aerial operations and battles involving Germany
Expeditionary units and formations